The Imperial Crowns of Charles VII are kept in the treasury at the Munich Residenz. Since the imperial crown was merely used as coronation crown, the Holy Roman Emperors used different crowns for all other purposes. While the Habsburg were in possession of their own imperial crowns, Charles VII did not possess an imperial crown when he was elected emperor in 1742. Thus, he ordered a crown from a goldsmith in Augsburg and one from another artisan in Frankfurt am Main.

External links 
 Treasury of the Munich Residenz

Charles VII